Giebło  is a village in the administrative district of Gmina Ogrodzieniec, within Zawiercie County, Silesian Voivodeship, in southern Poland.

References

External links 
 Giebło in the Geographical Dictionary of the Kingdom of Poland 

Villages in Zawiercie County